Esparragosa de la Serena is a municipality in the province of Badajoz, Extremadura, Spain. It has a population of 1,108 and an area of 21.66 km².

References

Municipalities in the Province of Badajoz